Tonna morrisoni is a species of large sea snail, a marine gastropod mollusk in the family Tonnidae, the tun shells.

Description
The length of the shell attains 90 mm.

Distribution
This marine species occurs off South Africa, Mozambique and Madagascar

References

 Vos, C. (2007) A conchological Iconography (No. 13) - The family Tonnidae. 123 pp., 30 numb. plus 41 (1 col.) un-numb. text-figs, 33 maps., 63 col. pls, Conchbooks, Germany

External links

Tonnidae
Gastropods described in 2005